The Honourable Kenneth Howard Randolph "Randy" Horton, JP, MP is a former soccer and cricket player from Bermuda who is currently Speaker of the House of Assembly of Bermuda. He was named North American Soccer League Most Valuable Player in 1972.

Biography
Horton was born on 22 January 1945 in Bermuda. He attended Culham College in England and Rutgers University in the United States.

Sports
A top level cricketer offered trials to play for Worcestershire County Cricket Club, Horton turned down the opportunity to play English County cricket and Football League football for Huddersfield Town to stay in a warmer climate following completing his Oxford University Institute of Education Teacher Training Certificate from Culham College in Oxfordshire, England. He represented Bermuda national cricket team five times between 1969 and 1980.

Soccer

Club career
He signed with the New York Cosmos as was named NASL Rookie of the Year and First Team all-star for the 1971 season.

The Cosmos won the league championship in 1972 as Horton was named league MVP, as voted by the players, as he led the league in scoring with 22 points in 13 games. He also scored New York's first goal in their 2–1 Finals win over St. Louis. After the 1972 season Horton was offered a contract with Queens Park Rangers by their manager Gordon Jago. Horton decided to remain with Cosmos and complete his master's degree at Rutgers University in New Jersey. Horton played two more summers with the Cosmos before being traded to the Washington Diplomats for three first-round draft picks. After a season in Washington, he finished his NASL career playing for the Hartford Bicentennials.

In Bermuda, Horton played for and coached the Somerset Trojans and represented Bermuda.

Politics
Horton has been a member of the Bermuda Parliament since 1998 and has held cabinet positions as Community Affairs and Sports Minister, Education Minister, Environment Minister and Labour Home Affairs and Public Safety Minister. On 8 February 2013 he was elected unopposed as Speaker of the House of Assembly, becoming the first member of an opposition party to hold that position.

Awards
1971 Rookie of the Year for the New York Cosmos
1971 First Team All-Star (NASL)
1972 Most Valuable Player in NASL
1972 Leading Scorer in NASL
1972 Leading Goal Scorer in NASL
1972 First Team All-Star (NASL)
1973 Second Team All-Star (NASL)
1974 Honorable Mention All-Star (NASL)
1974, Bermuda Jaycees' Outstanding Young Person Award
1981, Selected as one of Ten Most Admired Adults in Bermuda by the Annual Teen Conference

References

External links
New York Cosmos Soccer, Inc.
Bermuda election 2003 candidate page

1945 births
Living people
Speakers of the House of Assembly of Bermuda
Bermudian cricketers
Bermudian footballers
Association football forwards
North American Soccer League (1968–1984) players
New York Cosmos players
Philadelphia Ukrainian Nationals players
Washington Diplomats (NASL) players
Connecticut Bicentennials players
Ministers of Education of Bermuda
Ministers of the Environment of Bermuda
Interior ministers of Bermuda
Labour ministers of Bermuda
Sports ministers of Bermuda
Bermudian sportsperson-politicians
Bermudian expatriate footballers
Bermuda international footballers
Expatriate soccer players in the United States
Bermudian expatriate sportspeople in the United States
People from Sandys Parish